Walk In Lay Down (commonly referred to as WILD) is a biannual concert event held in the Brookings Quadrangle at Washington University in St. Louis and has been a campus tradition since its inception in 1973. WILD, produced by the WUSTL Social Programming Board, is sponsored by the Washington University Student Union and is the largest student run event at the university. WILD is free to university undergraduate students and has rooted itself in the campus culture as an exciting time of the semester for students of the university to get together and celebrate free live music, food, and friends.

History
WILD was first held in 1973 and was originally presented as a movie screening event. Around the 1980s, the event then expanded to incorporate musical acts to accompany the movies. By the early 1990s, the movies were dropped altogether and WILD became the music festival that it is now. In 2013, production of WILD was passed on from student group Team 31 Productions to the WUSTL Social Programming Board.

WILD was built on a history of Washington University hosting great music including Ray Charles (1959), The Righteous Brothers (1966), The Temptations (1966), the Kingsmen, Simon and Garfunkel (1967) the Loving Spoonful (1967), the Yardbirds (1967), the Grateful Dead (1989), the Velvet Underground (1969), Jethro Tull (1970), Sly and the Family Stone (1973), Frank Zappa (1977), the Replacements (1987), BB King (1987).

The event is named for an old tradition in which students would bring sofas into the quad and lie on them while watching the performances. Although this tradition is no longer allowed, in Fall 2007 the university permitted that inflatable couches be allowed in the quad during the concert in an attempt to revive the tradition.

Due to the university hosting the second 2016 presidential candidate debate on October 9, Fall WILD 2016 was cancelled for the first time in 30 years.

In 2017, an "alternative WILD" was staged in protest to the headliner act, Lil Dicky.  A walkout was staged followed the performance by the opener, Lizzo.

T-Pain was meant to headline Spring WILD 2019 but pulled out last minute due to a mandatory vocal rest. Roy Woods was booked as last minute as an additional performer as Loud Luxury was bumped to headliner. Elley Duhé was also meant to perform, but had to cancel.

Due to the COVID-19 Pandemic in 2020, the university suspended in-person classes, requiring students to remain home for the remainder of the Spring 2020 semester, causing Spring WILD 2020 to be cancelled.  Subsequent WILD events were also cancelled before finally returning to campus in Spring 2022 with headliner Zedd.

Past WILD performers
The following is a chronology of past WILD performers.

Commentary on name 
Student Life, the university's newspaper, published an op-ed that pointed out that the name Walk In, Lay Down is not grammatically correct.

See also
Campus life at Washington University in St. Louis

References

External links
SPB/WILD Official Site

Washington University in St. Louis
Semiannual events